Hoàng Lập Ngôn (1910 in Hanoi – 16 March 2006) was a Vietnamese painter. His son is the painter Hoàng Hồng Cẩm.

References

1910 births
2006 deaths
People from Hanoi
20th-century Vietnamese painters